Xanthopiodus is a genus of beetles in the family Cerambycidae, containing the following species:

 Xanthopiodus angulicollis Fairmaire, 1897
 Xanthopiodus hiekei Vives, 2001

References

Dorcasominae